Clarine Nardi Riddle (born 1949) is a former Attorney General of Connecticut, United States, serving from 1989 to 1991. She is the only woman to have held that position.

Education
Riddle earned a degree with honors in mathematics at Indiana University in 1971. In 1974, she earned a law degree from the Indiana University School of Law. She received an honorary Doctor of Humane Letters from Saint Joseph College.

Career
In 1979 Riddle was appointed assistant counsel to the Majority Leader of the Connecticut Senate.  In 1980 she was appointed New Haven's deputy corporation counsel.

From 1983 to 1985 Riddle was counsel to Attorney General Joseph I. Lieberman.  In 1986 Lieberman appointed Riddle Deputy Attorney General.

On December 22, 1988, Governor William O'Neill announced that he would appoint Nardi Riddle as Attorney General to fill the remainder of the term to which Lieberman had been elected in 1986; Lieberman resigned following his election to the United States Senate.  She was sworn in on January 3, 1989, and served until January 9, 1991.

During her tenure Nardi Riddle became the first female Attorney General to argue in front of the Supreme Court of the United States. She later served as Judge of the Connecticut Superior Court.

She served as chief of staff for Senator Lieberman from 2003 until he left the Senate in 2013.

Nardi Riddle has held numerous positions in both government and the private sector including Senior Vice President and General Counsel of the National Multi Housing Council.

As of 2013 Nardi Riddle is counsel in the Washington, DC office of Kasowitz, Benson, Torres & Friedman.

She co-founded the political organization, No Labels, and served on the Constitutional Democracy Board of Directors at the Indiana University Maurer School of Law Center.  She is a member of the Board at the Connecticut Policy Institute, and holds a seat on the Board of Advisors of The National Bureau of Asian Research.

Nardi Riddle is admitted to practice before the U.S. Supreme Court; U.S. District Court, District of Connecticut; and U.S. Court of Appeals, Second Circuit. She is also admitted to the Connecticut and D.C. bars.

Recognition

 In 2020, Riddle was awarded a 2020 Women, Influence & Power in Law Award for Lifetime Achievement by Corporate Counsel.

See also 
 List of female state attorneys general in the United States

References 

1949 births
Living people
Connecticut Attorneys General
Women in Connecticut politics
National Bureau of Asian Research
21st-century American women